Lawrence Johnston is the name of:

 Lawrence W. Johnston (1871–1958), British garden designer and plantsman
 Lawrence H. Johnston (1918–2011), American physicist
 Lawrence P. Johnston, American architect, a designer of Glenn Dale Hospital